Red Oak Creek or Bullock Creek is a   stream and tributary of the Trinity River in North Texas.

Navigable Waterway
Red Oak Creek is a Navigable Waterway according to the Texas Parks & Wildlife Department. The Creek is owned by the State of Texas. By Texas State Law, the public is allowed access to the Creek bed along the entire creek despite the water level.

Course

References

 

Rivers of Dallas County, Texas
Rivers of Ellis County, Texas
Rivers of Texas
Trinity River (Texas)